Rochester Academy Charter School (RACS) is a charter school in Rochester, New York serving students from the 6th to 12th grade. It became Rochester's first charter high school when it was approved by the New York State Board of Regents in 2007.

References

External links
 

Charter schools in New York (state)
Public high schools in New York (state)
Public middle schools in New York (state)
High schools in Monroe County, New York